Yavatmal-Hingoli Lok Sabha constituency is one of the 48 Lok Sabha (parliamentary) constituencies in Maharashtra state in western India.

Assembly segments
Presently, after the implementation of delimitation of the parliamentary constituencies in 2008, based on the recommendations of the Delimitation Commission of India constituted in 2002,Yavatmal-Hingoli Lok Sabha constituency comprises six Vidhan Sabha (legislative assembly) segments. These segments with constituency numbers are:

Members of Parliament

Election results

General elections 2019

General elections 2014

General elections 2009

See also
 Yavatmal district
 Hingoli district
 Nanded district
 List of Constituencies of the Lok Sabha

Notes

External links
 A map of the Lok Sabha constituencies in Maharashtra
Hingoli lok sabha  constituency election 2019 results details

Lok Sabha constituencies in Maharashtra
Hingoli district
Politics of Nanded district
Yavatmal district
1977 establishments in Maharashtra